The Cayman Islands competed at the 2011 Pan American Games in Guadalajara, Mexico, October 14–30, 2011. The Cayman Islands sent twelve athletes in four sports, the same number as from the 2007 Pan American Games in Rio de Janeiro. The Chef de Mission of the team is general secretary of the Cayman Islands Football Association, Bruce Blake.

The Cayman Islands won its first ever gold medal at the Pan American Games.

Medalists

Athletics

Cayman Islands sent an athletics team of seven athletes.

Men

*Jon Rankin was advanced to the final due to interference.

Equestrian

For the first time ever the Cayman Islands has qualified one athlete in equestrian.

Dressage

Shooting

Cayman Islands sent a shooting team of two trap shooters.

Men

Swimming

Cayman Islands sent a swimming team. The team includes the only medalist for the Cayman Islands at the 2007 Pan American Games, Shaune Fraser.

Men

Women

References

External links
Cayman Islands entries

Nations at the 2011 Pan American Games
P
2011